The LSU Tigers softball team represents Louisiana State University in NCAA Division I college softball. The team participates in the Southeastern Conference (SEC) and plays home games in Tiger Park. The team is currently coached by Beth Torina.

History
LSU has won nine Western Division titles, five regular season SEC championships and five SEC tournament championships. LSU has also appeared in six Women's College World Series and nineteen NCAA tournaments. The team has finished third at the Women's College World series four times (2001, 2004, 2015, 2016) and fifth two times (2012, 2017).

Carol Smith era
LSU softball had its beginnings in 1979 with a team coached by Carol Smith. However, after only three seasons, LSU decided to disband its softball program. During Smith's tenure, she coached the team to an overall record of 45–28 (.616).

Cathy Compton era
In 1997 the Southeastern Conference decided to begin sponsoring softball, partly to help member institutions to comply with Title IX. LSU softball was reborn with the hiring of Cathy Compton from Nicholls State University. Compton was head coach from 1997 through the 1998 regular season and finished with an overall record of 100–26 (.797) and 41–12 (.774) in the SEC.

Glenn Moore era
Glenn Moore became head coach at LSU starting with the 1998 NCAA Tournament. He was head coach at LSU through the 2000 season and compiled a 117–25 (.824) overall record and 53–7 (.883) SEC record.

Yvette Girouard era
In 2001, LSU hired NFCA Hall of Fame head coach Yvette Girouard from the University of Louisiana at Lafayette. During her 11 years as head coach, Girouard had an overall record of 526–171–1 (.754) and SEC record of 220–93–1 (.702). She led the Tigers to two College Women's World Series appearances and made the NCAA Tournament in ten of her eleven years as head coach. She coached LSU to three SEC championships (2001, 2002, 2004) and four SEC tournament championships (2001, 2002, 2004, 2007). She retired following the 2011 season. 

During Girouard's tenure as head coach, LSU moved into the new Tiger Park during the spring of 2009 after previously playing at the Original Tiger Park that opened in 1997.

Beth Torina era
On June 9, 2011, LSU announced long-time Alabama head coach Patrick Murphy was hired to replace Yvette Girouard. However, three days later, Murphy announced that he had changed his mind and would remain at Alabama. LSU then hired Beth Torina, head coach at Florida International University (FIU) on June 20, 2011. Torina led the Tigers to the Women's College World Series in her first season as head coach in 2012 and also has led the Tigers to the World Series in 2015, 2016 and 2017. 

With Torina as head coach, the program earned its 1,000th victory on May 1, 2016 after defeating the Arkansas Razorbacks 9-1 in Fayetteville, Arkansas.

Year-by-Year Records

Awards and honors

National awards
Women's College World Series MVP
Kristin Schmidt (2004)
NFCA Catcher of the Year
Killian Roessner (2007)

Conference awards
SEC Player of the Year
Ashlee Ducote (2000)
Britni Sneed (2001)
Trena Peel (2002)
SEC Pitcher of the YearBritni Sneed (2002)

SEC Freshman of the Year
Rachele Fico (2010)
Bianka Bell (2013)

SEC Tournament MVP
Ashley Lewis (1999)
Britni Sneed (2001, 2002)
Kristin Schmidt (2003, 2004)
Dani Hofer (2007)

All-Americans

Stadiums

Tiger ParkTiger Park''' opened in 2009 and serves as the home field of the LSU Tigers softball team. The official capacity of the stadium is 1,289 people. The stadium also features an outfield berm, renamed the Tiger Park Terrace in 2016, that can accommodate an additional 1,200 fans.[1]

Tiger Park (1997)

The original Tiger Park was a softball stadium located on the campus of Louisiana State University in Baton Rouge, Louisiana.[1] It served as the home field of the LSU Tigers softball team from 1997-2008. The official capacity of the stadium was 1,000 people. The stadium was opened prior to the 1997 college softball season and played host to four NCAA Regionals in 1999, 2000, 2001, and 2006 and hosted the 2008 SEC softball tournament. The 2008 season was the twelfth and final season in the original Tiger Park. LSU closed out the original Tiger Park with a home record of 331-51, including 140-34 in the SEC and 1-1 in the SEC Tournament.

Practice and Training facilities

LSU Strength and Conditioning facility
 
The LSU North Stadium Weight Room strength training and conditioning facility is located in the LSU Strength and Conditioning facility. Built in 1997, it is located adjacent to Tiger Stadium. Measuring 10,000-square feet with a flat surface, it has 28 multi-purpose power stations, 36 assorted selectorized machines and 10 dumbbell stations along with a plyometric specific area, medicine balls, hurdles, plyometric boxes and assorted speed and agility equipment. It also features 4 treadmills, 6 stationary bikes, 4 elliptical cross trainers, 2 stair stepper and stepmill.

Head coaches

See also
LSU Tigers and Lady Tigers
List of NCAA Division I softball programs

Footnotes

References

External links
 

 
Sports clubs established in 1979
1979 establishments in Louisiana